Grabovo is the name of several rural localities in Russia:
Grabovo, Penza Oblast, a selo in Grabovsky Selsoviet of Bessonovsky District of Penza Oblast
Grabovo, Pskov Oblast, a village in Bezhanitsky District of Pskov Oblast